The AR-57, also known as the AR Five Seven, is available as either an upper receiver for the AR-15/M16 rifle or a complete rifle, firing 5.7×28mm rounds from standard FN P90 magazines. 

It was designed by AR57 LLC and was produced by AR57 of Kent, Washington, United States.

History
Venezuelan soldiers who defected to Juan Guaidó were photographed using an AR-57 during the crisis in Venezuela in 2019.

Design
The AR-57 PDW upper is a new design on AR-15/M16 rifles, blending the AR-15/M16 lower with a lightweight, monolithic upper receiver system chambered in FN 5.7×28mm. This model is also sold as a complete rifle, supplied with two 50-round P90 magazines. The magazines mount horizontally on top of the front handguard, with brass ejecting through the magazine well. Hollow AR-15 magazines can be used to catch spent casings.

Unlike the standard AR-15 configuration which uses a gas-tube system , the AR-57 cycles via straight blowback. A fully automatic version exists and was marketed as a competitor to the P90 and other personal defense weapons.

User

See also
AR-15 variants

References

External links
Official website

5.7×28mm firearms
Semi-automatic rifles
ArmaLite AR-10 derivatives